Dog Bites Man was a partially improvised comedy television show on Comedy Central that aired in summer 2006.  It began airing on The Comedy Channel in Australia in June 2007.  The series was produced by DreamWorks Television.

Premise 
Dog Bites Man was a parody of local news coverage, and followed the misadventures of a struggling news team from Spokane, Washington as they traveled around the country producing news segments.  A mockumentary, the show incorporated scenes with the cast in traditional skits as well as them improvising with non-actors, who believed that they are an actual (albeit unusual) news crew.

Disclaimer 
Perhaps to lessen confusion pertaining to the true reality of the show, starting with episode five each episode began with the following message: "With the exception of the news team, the following episode contains real people who were not made aware they were being filmed as part of a comedy show."

Cast
 Zach Galifianakis as Alan Finger, the show's incompetent director.  Also a musician, in episode three he scored a hit song in Panama City using the name "The Finger" (the song was titled "Come on and Get It (Up in Dem Guts)").
 A.D. Miles as Marty Shonson, an intern who serves as a production assistant.
 Andrea Savage as Tillie Sullivan, the team's producer.
 Matt Walsh as Kevin Beekin, the star reporter for the news show, who used to date Tillie the producer and still has feelings for her.

Cancellation
When asked on Michael Showalter's webisode series The Michael Showalter Showalter if Comedy Central had cancelled the show, Zach Galifianakis replied "Yes, thank God." He went on to explain that "messing with people" made him uncomfortable.

Episodes
All titles were prefaced with "Assignment:"

Home media
The series was released on DVD by DreamWorks Home Entertainment.

Producers and creators
Jonathan Barry - Executive Producer
Justin Falvey - Executive Producer
Darryl Frank - Executive Producer
Dan Mazer - Executive Producer
Keith Raskin - Producer
Dan Mazer - Creator

See also
Crossballs: The Debate Show

References
 Journos Go Wild, Village Voice, June 1, 2006

External links 
 

2000s American mockumentary television series
2000s American satirical television series
2000s American sitcoms
2000s American television news shows
2000s American workplace comedy television series
2006 American television series debuts
2006 American television series endings
American news parodies
Comedy Central original programming
Criticism of journalism
English-language television shows
Television series by DreamWorks Television

Television news sitcoms
Television shows set in Washington (state)
Hoaxers